The flag of Hamilton was designed by Bishop Ralph Spence and granted to the city on July 15, 2003.

The flag was specially designed to complement the Canadian flag being a triband with a Canadian pale at centre. The colours are yellow and royal blue. In the centre is a golden yellow cinquefoil which, as the badge of Clan Hamilton, represents the city's name. The chain on the outside symbolizes both unity and the community's steel industry. The six links in the chain represent the city's six communities: Hamilton, Ancaster, Dundas, Flamborough, Glanbrook, and Stoney Creek.

Description 
On a field golden yellow a Canadian pale royal blue charged with a cinquefoil encircled by a chain of six large and six small links alternated, all golden yellow.

References

External links 
 City of Hamilton Official Page
 FOTW Flags Of The World website - Hamilton
 The Public Register of Arms, Flags and Badges of Canada

Flags of cities in Ontario
Flag
Hamilton
Flags introduced in 2003
2003 establishments in Ontario